Somersville (sometimes spelled Summersville) is an unincorporated community in York Township, Union County, Ohio, United States.

History
The community of Somersville was laid in 1834 by Thomas Price and William Somers.  The Bokes Creek Post Office was established April 26, 1850, with Amon S. Davis as postmaster, and was discontinued on June 30, 1904.  As of 1877, the town contained two grocery stores, a blacksmith shop, a shoe shop, and one physician.  The mail service is now sent through the Peoria Post Office.

References

Unincorporated communities in Union County, Ohio
Unincorporated communities in Ohio